The Sunrisers Hyderabad (stylised as SunRisers Hyderabad,  SRH) are  a franchise cricket team based in Hyderabad, Telangana, India, that plays in the Indian Premier League (IPL). The franchise is owned by Kalanithi Maran of the Sun TV Network and was founded in 2012 after the Hyderabad-based Deccan Chargers were terminated by the IPL. The team is currently captained by Kane Williamson and coached by Tom Moody. Their primary home ground is the Rajiv Gandhi International Cricket Stadium, Hyderabad, which has capacity of 55,000.

The team made their first IPL appearance in 2013, where they reached the playoffs, eventually finishing in fourth place. The Sunrisers won their maiden IPL title in the 2016 season, defeating Royal Challengers Bangalore by 8 runs in the final. The team has qualified for the play-off stage of the tournament in every season since 2016 making them rack up more wins than the all celebrated RCB. In 2018, the team reached the finals of the Indian Premier League, but lost to Chennai Super Kings. David Warner is the leading run scorer for the side, having won the Orange Cap 3 times, in 2015, 2017, and 2019. Bhuvneshwar Kumar is the leading wicket-taker. The coronavirus pandemic impacted the brand value of the Sunrisers Hyderabad which was estimated to be 57.4million in 2020 as the overall brand of IPL was decreased to 4.4billion, according to Brand Finance.

Listing criteria 
In general the top five are listed in each category (except when there is a tie for the last place among the five, when all the tied record holders are noted).

Listing notation 
Team notation
 (200–3) indicates that a team scored 200 runs for three wickets and the innings was closed, either due to a successful run chase or if no playing time remained
 (200) indicates that a team scored 200 runs and was all out

Batting notation
 (100) indicates that a batsman scored 100 runs and was out
 (100*) indicates that a batsman scored 100 runs and was not out

Bowling notation
 (5–20) indicates that a bowler has captured 5 wickets while conceding 20 runs

Currently playing
  indicates a current cricketer

Start Date
 indicates the date the match starts

Team records

Team Performance

Team wins, losses and draws

Result records

Greatest win margin (by runs)

Greatest win margin (by balls remaining)

Greatest win margins (by wickets)

Narrowest win margin (by runs)

Narrowest win margin (by balls remaining)

Narrowest win margins (by wickets)

Tied Matches

Greatest loss margin (by runs)

Greatest loss margin (by balls remaining)

Greatest loss margins (by wickets)

Narrowest loss margin (by runs)

Narrowest loss margin (by balls remaining)

Narrowest loss margins (by wickets)

Team scoring records

Highest Totals

Lowest Totals

Highest Totals Conceded

Lowest Totals Conceded

Highest match aggregate

Lowest match aggregate

Individual Records (Batting)

Most runs

Highest individual score

Highest career average

Highest strike rates

Most half-centuries

Most centuries

Most Sixes

Most Fours

Highest strike rates in an inning

Most sixes in an inning

Most fours in an inning

Most runs in a series

Most ducks

Individual Records (Bowling)

Most career wickets

Best figures in an innings

Best career average

Best career economy rate

Best career strike rate

Most four-wickets (& over) hauls in an innings

Best economy rates in an inning

Best strike rates in an inning

Most runs conceded in a match

Most wickets in a series

Hat-trick

Individual Records (Wicket-keeping)

Most career dismissals

Most career catches

Most career stumpings

Most dismissals in an innings

Most dismissals in a series

Individual Records (Fielding)

Most career catches

Most catches in an innings

Most catches in a series

Individual Records (Other)

Most matches

Most matches as captain

Partnership Record

Highest partnerships by wicket

Highest partnerships by runs

Awards

Orange cap
Note: Orange cap winners are the players with most runs in a season

 Last updated: 5 June 2019

Purple cap 
Note: Purple cap winners are the players with most wickets in a season

 Last updated: 5 June 2019

Player of the match (final)

 Last updated: 5 June 2019

IPL Fair Play Award
Note: The Fair Play Award is given after each season to the team with the best record of fair play.
 Winners (2):  2016, 2019
 Last updated: 5 June 2019

Miscellaneous Awards
2016 Indian Premier League
 Emerging player of the season: Mustafizur Rahman
 Vitara Brezza Glam Shot of the Season: David Warner
2017 Indian Premier League
 Vitara Brezza Glam Shot of the Season: Yuvraj Singh
 Last updated: 18 June 2019

External  Links
Sunrisers Hyderabad at IPLT20.com

References 

Lists of Indian cricket records and statistics
Stats
Indian Premier League lists
Sunrisers Hyderabad cricketers